Jonathan Sobol is a Canadian film director and screenwriter. His credits include the films Citizen Duane, A Beginner's Guide to Endings, The Art of the Steal and The Padre.

Originally from Niagara Falls, Ontario, Sobol is currently based in Toronto.

References

External links

Canadian male screenwriters
Film directors from Toronto
Living people
People from Niagara Falls, Ontario
Writers from Toronto
Year of birth missing (living people)